Edward "Ted" Smith (born 24 September 1935) is an Australian former soccer player and coach.

Between 1961 and 1964 Smith played for South Melbourne in the Victorian State League. He moved to Melbourne Hakoah in 1965.

Smith represented Australia at the 1956 Olympic Games.

References

Living people
1935 births
Australian soccer players
Association football wingers
Australia international soccer players
Footballers at the 1956 Summer Olympics
Olympic soccer players of Australia